Faveria minutella is a species of moth in the family Pyralidae. It was described by Ragonot in 1885. It is found in Sri Lanka.

References

Moths described in 1885
Phycitini
Moths of Asia